Big Slide Mountain can refer to several mountains: